Grass Island can refer to
 Grass Island, Hong Kong
 Grass Island (Canada)
 Grass Island, South Georgia
 Grass Island (Hawaii), a small island located in Midway Atoll